Seiko Films was a Philippine film production company owned and run by Robbie Tan. It is known for its bold film of the late 1990s. Seiko Films was known for its tagline "If it's from Seiko, it must be good" used from 1989 to 1994.

History
Seiko Films made its initial offering in 1984 with the trio of Tito Sotto, Vic Sotto and Joey de Leon starring in Goodah!, directed by Mike Relon Makiling. Since then, after the People Power Revolution, Seiko Films fast became one of the major productions in the late 80s, alongside Monteverde's Regal Films and Vic Del Rosario's Viva Films. The film production is home to its homegrown stars, mostly Regal babies like Romnick Sarmenta, Sheryl Cruz, Rey "PJ" Abellana and Gretchen Barretto as well as talents inside Seiko like Jestoni Alarcon, Ian Veneracion, John Regala, Cesar Montano and Rita Avila. Among its most memorable productions during its early years are The Life Story of Julie Vega and Blusang Itim, as well as horror flicks Huwag Mong Buhayin Ang Bangkay,Nilamon ka lang sa Putik and Hiwaga sa Balete Drive.

Seiko Films founder Robbie Tan explained in 1989 that his decision-making process when it comes to greenlighting film projects is primarily based on what is popular among audiences.

In 1989, Seiko ventured into action movies, by the time the genre was on the rise. Among its notable action movies produced were Ang Lihim ng Golden Buddha and Alyas Baby Face, as well as biopics Ako ang Batas: General Karingal, Canary Brothers and Lt. Col. Alejandro Yanquling, and DZRH-based dramas Kunin Mo ang Ulo ni Ismael, Kasalanan ang Buhayin Ka and Lumaban Ka, Itay. Majority of the movies produced throughout the 90s are focused on this genre.

In 1995, Seiko ventured into ST (sex trip) production, particularly with Rosanna Roces, Priscilla Almeda and Natasha Ledesma. Despite its pornographic content, Seiko's movies made Rosanna Roces a popular sex symbol. Roces' departure from Seiko also made her a household name in movies outside Seiko, mostly from Viva and Regal, making her an award-winning actress. This would be Seiko's focus starting in 2000.

In 2003, Seiko Films ventured into wholesome films. The Liberated series, directed by Mac Alejandre, became those of the most important films in the history of Seiko. Seiko produced movies later like Bridal Shower (2003), the mockumentary Bikini Open (2005), the family comedy I Wanna Be Happy (2006) and the psycho-erotic thriller Silip (2007). Seiko Films also co-produced the award-winning Foster Child (2007) by director Brilliante Mendoza.

In 2007, Seiko was reportedly suspended by the Movie and Television Review and Classification Board (MTRCB) due to the prominence of the production of sexual oriented movies. It was later revealed that it closed down due to intense competition with major film outlets. Since then, Tan shifted his focus on his wallet business.

Remakes of Seiko Movies
This is a list of some movies produced by Seiko that were remade as TV series:
 Sineserye Presents: Natutulog Ba ang Diyos? (ABS-CBN, 2007)
 Magkano ang Iyong Dangal? (ABS-CBN, 2010)
 Blusang Itim (GMA Network, 2011)
 Kokak (GMA Network, 2011)
 Mundo Man ay Magunaw (ABS-CBN, 2012)

References

Philippine film studios
Film production companies of the Philippines
Mass media companies established in 1984
Mass media companies disestablished in 2007
Pornographic film studios